Margherita Sparapani Gentili Boccapadule (Camerino, 29 October 1735 - Rome, 13 December 1820), was a Roman noble, salon holder, and traveler. She was also known for her interest in literature and nature science, and a member of the Accademia degli Arcadi.

Notes

1735 births
1820 deaths
Italian salon-holders
Members of the Academy of Arcadians